Elizabeth Wilson (1914-2000) was an American screenwriter, playwright, and TV writer active during the 1950s and 1960s; she was known for her work on Westerns.

Biography 
Elizabeth was the daughter of silent film actress Myrtle Owen and George Anderson. Although she was born in Oklahoma, she moved to Los Angeles as a young girl, where she attended and graduated from Hollywood High School. After graduation, she worked at the Stanley Rose bookstore on Hollywood Boulevard. She later worked as a journalist at magazines and newspapers.

In the 1950s, she and her husband, writer-director Richard Wilson, wrote Westerns together, including Invitation to a Gunfighter. In 1951, she was called to testify about her former ties to the Communist Party. She revealed that she had been a member from 1937 through 1947, and had worked on several projects that aimed to help elect candidates who the Communist Party favored.

Selected filmography 

 Invitation to a Gunfighter (1964)
 Raw Wind in Eden (1958)
 Cave of Outlaws (1951)

References

External links

American women screenwriters
Hollywood High School alumni
1914 births
2000 deaths
20th-century American women writers
20th-century American screenwriters